Nour Ahmad Muhammad El-Afandi (born 10 January 1993) is an Egyptian synchronized swimmer. She competed in the women's team event at the 2012 Olympic Games.

References 

1993 births
Living people
Egyptian synchronized swimmers
Olympic synchronized swimmers of Egypt
Synchronized swimmers at the 2012 Summer Olympics